The Junkers Jumo 223 was an experimental 24-cylinder aircraft engine based on the Junkers Jumo 205. Like the Jumo 205, it was an opposed piston two-stroke diesel engine. It had four banks of six cylinders in a rhomboid configuration, with four crankshafts, one at each vertex of the rhombus, and 48 pistons. It was designed for a power of 2,500 horsepower at 4,400 rpm, and weighed around 2,370 kg.

Only one example is known to have been built.  It is rumoured to have been taken to Moscow at the end of World War II, where development may have continued.

Jumo 224 
In 1942 the 223 was abandoned in favour of an even larger engine, the Jumo 224 with an intended output power of 4,500 horsepower.

The Jumo 223 series was influential to the successful three-crankshaft Napier Deltic engine.

References

Bibliography

External links
 Multi-crankshafts opposed piston engines (2)
 Jumo 223 Entry at the Hugo Junkers Homepage
 Old Machine Press' Junkers Jumo 223 engine page
 OpposedpistonEngines.com's Jumo 223 Page

Aircraft diesel engines
Two-stroke diesel engines
Opposed piston engines
Junkers aircraft engines
1940s aircraft piston engines

Abandoned military aircraft engine projects of Germany